In the mathematical field of graph theory, the windmill graph  is an undirected graph constructed  for  and  by joining  copies of the complete graph  at a shared universal vertex. That is, it is a 1-clique-sum of these complete graphs.

Properties
It has  vertices and  edges, girth 3 (if ), radius 1 and diameter 2.
It has vertex connectivity 1 because its central vertex is an articulation point; however, like the complete graphs from which it is formed, it is -edge-connected. It is trivially perfect and a block graph.

Special cases
By construction, the windmill graph  is the friendship graph , the windmill graph  is the star graph  and the windmill graph  is the butterfly graph.

Labeling and colouring
The windmill graph has chromatic number  and chromatic index . Its chromatic polynomial can be deduced form the chromatic polynomial of the complete graph and is equal to 

The windmill graph  is proved not graceful if . In 1979, Bermond  has conjectured that  is graceful for all .

Gallery

References 

Parametric families of graphs
Perfect graphs